Kneeboarding is an aquatic sport where the participant is towed on a buoyant, convex, and hydrodynamically shaped board at a planing speed, most often behind a motorboat. Kneeboarding on a surf style board with fin(s) is also done in waves at the beach. In the usual configuration of a tow-sport kneeboard, riders kneel on their heels on the board, and secure themselves to the deck with an adjustable Velcro strap over their thighs. Most water ski kneeboards do not have fins to allow for easier surface spins. As in wakeboarding or water skiing, the rider hangs onto a tow-rope. The advantages of kneeboarding versus other tow-sports seems to be an easier learning curve and a sense of being closer to the water when falls occur.

History
Kneeboards were first produced commercially in the 1970s. While they were not widely popular at first, kneeboarding had become widespread by the mid-1970s. Today, kneeboarding remains popular, with sales of about 100,000 units per year.

As waterskiing gained popularity, riders also experimented with kneeling down on round plywood discs. Others tried kneeling on surfboards and some used purpose-built kneeboards designed specifically for riding waves, but the water ski kneeboard did not emerge as a product until the 1970s.

The first commercially available water ski kneeboard was Knee Ski, co-invented by Mike Murphy and Bud Hulst in 1972. Hulst had a background in surfing, manufacturing kneeboards for wave riding under the name of El Paipo. Murphy had been a professional show skier. The original Knee Ski was made from molded fiberglass, like a boat hull, and was neutrally buoyant. Each Knee Ski had a flat neoprene pad covering the entire deck, and a Velcro strap.

In 1973, John Taylor, a former Knee Ski employee, decided to make and sell his own boards under the name of Glide Slide. Taylor took a new approach, blow molding a plastic shell and filling it with foam. Unfortunately the teardrop design was unstable, and Glide Slide faltered as the 1973 oil crisis slowed the water sports industry.

Danny Churchill, quarter mile speed ski record holder in 1974 and former Glide Slide employee, bought the company in the wake of the oil crisis. Churchill redesigned the Glide Slide, in conjunction with fellow employee and engineer John Tanner, to make it more stable, and renamed the product Hydroslide in 1976. Churchill is most commonly known for popularizing the sport through advertising and promotions in the newly released full color water ski publications of the late 1970s and early 1980s.

In the early 1980s the very first association for competition was formed called the International Kneeboard Association (IKA). Founded by Roland Hillier of Maitland, Florida, a former World Overall and Slalom Champion; National Slalom and Trick Champion; Masters Overall Water Ski Champion and three time Intercollegiate Overall Champion. Hillier created the rules and regulations for kneeboarding not only for boat towing method but also cableway towing.  In boat towing the three competition events were tricks, slalom and wake crossing.  A special event was also included to be called the "Flip-off" to see how many flips could be completed in twenty seconds.   This proved to be quite popular with the spectators.  In cableway competition, Roland designed the trick event which also included the use of  small ramps for doing spins and flips.  Calculations were needed to adjust for cableway towline length when the water levels changed.   Roland Hillier also wrote and published the first book on kneeboarding called "Kneeboarding A - Z". After several National Championships, he produced and broadcast on ABC and, later, PBS of "The International Kneeboard  Championships". This broadcast was the very first of its kind.  The next year, Sea World of Orlando approached the IKA to hold a National Championship at their park, however, the original sponsors to the IKA would not be allowed to participate and Hillier felt strongly that supporters should be included and did not accept. The American Kneeboarding Association (AKA) was founded by another group of people after the International Kneeboard Association rejected the Sea World offer, and created their own form of competition.   Eventually the AKA merged with USA WaterSki as one of its designated towable sports. ¹ Kneeboarding History

One of the earliest types of kneeboarding is 'tourist kneeboarding'. In this type of kneeboarding, the rider begins on land, already strapped to the board. This type of kneeboarding is far easier than normal kneeboarding, usually done in a river or on a lake. Regular kneeboarding is far superior to "tourist kneeboarding" because you are already in the water and can take off faster.

Description
Required equipment includes a tow rope, a kneeboard and a boat that can go about 15-20 mph (28–32 km/h). Also, most importantly, a certified life vest for safety. Kneeboarding starts are relatively simple, and the rider does not need to travel very quickly.

There are two basic grips – the palms-down grip and the baseball bat grip. For the palms-down grip the hands facing downward while holding the ski rope. For the Baseball Bat grip kneeboarders hold the handle just like a baseball bat.

Tricks
Here is a list of kneeboarding tricks:

 Riding - Ride with your arms at full extension (this keeps your arms from tiring,) your knees in the divits, and the strap on relatively tight.
 Turning - While riding, hold on tightly to the tow rope, and lean your body to one side. This should put the kneeboard on its edge, and take you outside of the boat's wake. To come back straight behind the boat, lean in the other direction. To turn more aggressively, pull in on the rope with your arms (the handle should be close to the hip, the opposite side from the side your turning to) and lean harder.
 Side Slide/Butter Slide - Position yourself directly behind the boat with a palms-down grip. Rotate the board sideways without turning on edge - the board should slide. As you slide sideways, lean back so the boat doesn't pull you forward. It makes it much easier if you pull the handle and place it on your hip while you turn sideways. You should lean away from the boat just a little.
 "Jumping the wake"- To jump the wake while on a kneeboard, simply cut hard out of the wake, get as far away from the boat as possible (to one side,) then use a progressively harder cut back toward the wake. Lean back slightly, and you will launch off the wake of the boat, sending you into the air. Make sure you hold the board flat by using your stomach muscles.
 The ole - To perform this trick, you must combine the skills of balance and riding one-handed. You pull in the tow rope, pulling in hand-over-hand, until you are holding the rope roughly  beyond the handle. From there, you hold the rope in one hand, near your hip, and then swing the remainder of the rope, along with the handle, above your head
 Surface 360 - This trick is very similar to the side slide. Slightly rotate to one side to build momentum, and then fully rotate in the opposite direction. If you are spinning to the right, release the rope with your right hand, spin, grab the rope again behind your back, and then pull yourself through to finish the 360.
 Riding Backwards - You go through exactly the same motion as a 360, but instead of pulling yourself through the 360, you pause while both hands are behind your back. You must lean forward while riding backwards - leaning what is forward to the rider will push the nose down and the tail up. Otherwise, the tail could go under the water and flip the rider.
 Wake Front-to-Back - Make a hard cut from outside the wake, using the palms-down grip. Right before you hit the wake, stop cutting and pop up in a jump, focusing on pushing your knees away from your chest to give you added height. As soon as you are airborne, rotate your body to the right and pull the handle to your hip. As you spin, keep a tight grip on the rope, and lean forward slightly. Keep leaning forward (away from the boat) as you hit the water. Once you have landed, you should be riding backwards, and can continue to ride with both hands at your hip.
 Wake 360 front-to-front (wrapped) - While in the middle of the wake, pull yourself towards the boat, collecting the rope in one hand. Then, wrap the rope around your back, and hold onto the handle. Let go of the rope, and the friction of the rope straightening will spin you around.
 Air (Ollie) - similar to the skateboarding trick of the same name, or a bunny hop in BMX, it is possible to jump without utilizing the wake. By pushing down against the water with your knees and simultaneously pulling the handle in provides more tension on the rope. Then pulling upwards with your legs, you can make the entire board leave the water. If this is combined with 'jumping' the wake, much greater heights can be achieved.
 Back Roll - Make a hard cut toward the wake. One millisecond before you hit the wake, flatten out. Ride up the wake while resisting it (see wake jump). At the top of the wake, and not before, throw your shoulders sideways in the direction of your roll. At the same time, look back over your shoulder and pull the handle to your waist. Your momentum will take you around and then you just need to land. If you are coming up short, you are most likely throwing the trick too soon, letting your arms out, or not throwing the trick sideways. If you lean forward at all, you will lose your rotation momentum.
 Switch 3 - The switch 3 is basically a wake 360 back except that you change the direction of rotation after 180 degrees. Make a hard cut toward the wake with a palms down grip. When you reach the trough, spin around 180 degrees. Rotate to the left if you're cutting to the right and rotate to the right if you're cutting to the left. Tuck the handle into your hip. Ride up the wake while resisting it to get a good pop. Once you are in the air and not sooner, spin back to the front. As you come around, keep the handle low and let your arms extend out. Once you reach the forward position, pull the handle to your waist again and spin backward in the opposite direction. Land backwards and use your second pop to spin back to the front. It's very important to keep the handle at your waist and your head up when landing.
 Frontflip - Edge in hard, flatten out, pop off the wake and immediately throw your body straight down, keeping both hands on the handle and close to your hip. This will help with rotation and control.

See also
 Aquaplaning (sport)

External links
 Kneeboarding's History

Towed water sports
Boardsports
Articles containing video clips
Kneeling